Be Aware is the seventh extended play by South Korean boy group The Boyz. It was released on August 16, 2022 through IST Entertainment. The EP consists of six tracks, including the lead single "Whisper", and its physical release was made available in three versions. The EP's physical and Meta versions collectively sold over 569,000 copies in their first week of release in South Korea and debuted at numbers one and two on the Circle Album Chart.

Background 
On August 16, The Boyz released their seventh extended play Be Aware.

A teaser for the music video was released on August 13, with the full music video released on August 16.

Track listing

Charts

Weekly charts

Monthly charts

Year-end charts

Accolades

Certifications

Release history

References 

2022 EPs
The Boyz (South Korean band) EPs